Carmarthen East and Dinefwr may refer to either of two constituencies in Wales that were originally geographically identical: 

 Carmarthen East and Dinefwr (UK Parliament constituency) (created 1997)
 Carmarthen East and Dinefwr (Senedd constituency) (created 1999)